Mayana Moura (born August 29, 1982) is a Brazilian actress and former model.

Filmography

Film

Television

Personal life
She was in a relationship with English actor Matt Smith from 2008 to 2009.

References

External links 

1982 births
Living people
Actresses from Rio de Janeiro (city)
Brazilian television actresses
Brazilian telenovela actresses
Brazilian film actresses
Brazilian stage actresses